Andrej Čadež (born September 12, 1942 in Ljubljana) is a Slovene physicist and astrophysicist.

He is the author of Fizika zvezd published in Ljubljana in 1986.

External links
 Bibliography 

Slovenian physicists
Slovenian astronomers
Scientists from Ljubljana
1942 births
Living people
Astrophysicists